Martin Brammer (born 13 May 1957) is an English singer, songwriter, composer and record producer. He is best known as the lead vocalist and primary lyricist of the pop trio Kane Gang. Brammer later developed his songwriting abilities to pen many successful tracks for a variety of notable musicians.

Brammer has been nominated for an Ivor Novello Award, and has been involved in the making of records that have sold over 20 million copies worldwide. He is currently the manager of the British punk rock band Vant.

Career 
Brammer was born in Seaham, County Durham, England. Part of a trio of local North East musicians, Brammer was a founding member of the Kane Gang, which started in late 1982. Brammer was their main songwriter and penned their smooth ballad "Closest Thing to Heaven", a UK top 20 chart hit in 1984. He also wrote other chart successes for them, including "Smalltown Creed" (1984), "Gun Law" (1985) and "Motortown" (1987). Kane Gang broke up in 1991.

Brammer then continued his career as a songwriter to the present day.  Songs he has written or co-written have been recorded by Tina Turner, James Morrison, Marco Mengoni, Josh Kumra, James Bay, Olly Murs, Nolwenn Leroy, Julian Velard, Melanie C, Urszula, Mr Hudson, Jack McManus, Beverley Knight, Rachel Stevens, Nick Carter, Lighthouse Family, Roland Gift, Sheena Easton, Mark Owen, Reigan Derry, Foxes and Stevie McCrorie. In addition, Brammer has contributed as record producer on various albums including Good Things Come to Those Who Don't Wait (Josh Kumra); Olly Murs and In Case You Didn't Know (Olly Murs); plus Now or Never (Nick Carter).

He also sang backing vocals on a 1994 album by Opus III (Guru Mother).

Brammer has his own recording studio in which he both writes and records, and favours using microphones manufactured by sE Electronics. Brammer's most recent work includes writing material for John Newman, Ella Eyre, Joel Compass, Karen Harding and Luke Friend.

Personal life 

Brammer has an ex-wife, Alia, and two daughters, Salma and Ella. He told BBC Radio 2 that he does not employ a manager.

Songwriting credits 

Apart from those written for Kane Gang, Brammer's songwriting credits include:

References 

1957 births
20th-century British male musicians
20th-century English composers
20th-century English singers
21st-century British male musicians
21st-century English composers
21st-century English singers
English male singers
English male singer-songwriters
English pop singers
English record producers
Living people
People from Seaham
Musicians from County Durham